Erev is a 1983 novel by Eli Schechtman. Erev's first edition  is the beginning of   Eli Schechtman's novel that was written in USSR and contained four books. The novel was published in (Sovetish Heymland) in magazine version - from 1961 up to 1968 and in book - in 1965. The novel tells about the life of Russian Jews of the early twentieth century.  The full Erev written and published in Israel in 1983 contain seven books. The novel tells about the life of Russian Jews of the early twentieth century until the end of World War II.

Overview and publication history
Erev is central Schechtman's literary work and was the first Yiddish-language novel published in the Soviet Union after the Stalin death. The first four parts of the novel were serialised in Sovetish Heymland from 1961 up to 1968. and only two parts were published in censored form as a book in Moscow in 1965.
In 1964 first two books of the novel were translated into French by Rachel Ertel under name À la vielle de.... In 1967 the same two books of novel were translated into English by Joseph Singer under name Erev, where author has been compared in stature to Fyodor Dostoevsky and Anton Chekhov. Four books were translated in Hebrew in Israel in 1975 by Zvi Arad under name Beterem.

Started after Eli Schechtman released from prison in 1953, the full text of Erev novel, consisting of seven books, was completed after thirty years in 1983 and published in Israel. A French translation by  appeared in 2018.

Plot summary

The novel tells the story of a Jewish family in Eastern Europe over four centuries, from its escape from a blood libel in medieval Germany to Russia in the early twentieth century. On the example of the Boyar's family history, author tells us about the fate of Jewish people throughout the 20th century – from the end of the Russo-Japanese War until the end of World War II and creation the state of Israel. The novel paints a rich and intricate gallery of characters facing consistent persecution, while ideology ranges from Czarism to Stalinism and Nazism.The Boiar family, although it suffered heavy losses by brutal upheavals of the era, never stopped fighting for its spiritual and physical survival.

Critical reception
Professor Shlomo Bikel has said: "Erev is one of the most important works that Soviet-Yiddish literature has given us."
Gennady Estraikh has described Erev as "one of the most accomplished novels in postwar Yiddish literature". Writing in the Jewish Quarterly in 1978, Elias Schulman argued that "If Soviet Yiddish literature could still produce a novel of the stature and quality of
Erev and [Nathan] Zabare's two-part masterpiece [Unter der heyser zun fun Provans and its sequel S'iz nokh groys der tog], we can assuredly assume that Russian Jewry has not yet exhausted its resources, and that Soviet Yiddish culture can yet be revived."\

Translations of novel Erev
Eli Schechtman

References

Further reading
 Itshe Goldberg, "Eli Shekhtman, 1908—1996," Yidishe kultur 11–12, (1996)

External links
 

1965 novels
1983 novels
20th-century Israeli novels
Yiddish-language literature
Novels by Eli Schechtman